The Klaskanine River is a tributary of the Youngs River, approximately  long, in northwest Oregon in the United States. It drains a small section of the Coast Range in the extreme northwest corner of the state in the watershed of the nearby Columbia River.

It rises in three short forks in the mountains in central Clatsop County, in the Clatsop State Forest north of Saddle Mountain State Natural Area. The Middle Fork joins the North Fork, which then joins the South Fork.

See also
List of Oregon rivers

References

Rivers of Oregon
Rivers of Clatsop County, Oregon
Oregon placenames of Native American origin